Nikola Dragičević (Serbian Cyrillic: Никола Драгичевић; born 26 March 1988) is a Serbian footballer.

External sources
 Nikola Dragičević Stats at Utakmica.rs

1988 births
Living people
Footballers from Belgrade
Serbian footballers
FK Teleoptik players
FK Srem players
FK Čukarički players
Association football defenders